My Thirty Years Backstairs at the White House is a 1961 autobiographical novel by Lillian Rogers Parks written with Frances Spatz Leighton. The title of the memoir was based on Parks' recollections of thirty years as a seamstress in the White House from 1931–1961 during the administrations of Hoover, Roosevelt, Truman, and Eisenhower.  The book also includes 30 previous years of childhood memories during the Taft, Wilson, Harding, Coolidge, Hoover, and Roosevelt administrations when her mother, Margaret 'Maggie' Rogers, performed domestic service as head housemaid at the White House from 1909–1939.  The popularity of the book and the depth of its detail caused First Lady Jacqueline Kennedy to have all White House domestic employees sign a pledge to not write about their White House experiences.

Film, TV and theatrical adaptations
NBC aired the miniseries Backstairs at the Whitehouse in 1979 which was based on the book. In the miniseries Lillian Rogers Parks was portrayed by Leslie Uggams.  Maggie Rogers was played by Olivia Cole who received an Emmy nomination for her performance.

References

External links
Lillian Rogers Parks obituary, The Washington Post, 12 November 1997.
Lillian Rogers Parks obituary, The New York Times, 12 November 1997.
Francis Spatz Leighton obituary, Los Angeles Times, 21 April 2007.
Backstairs at the White House, IMDB.com.
Clifford, Garry (January 29, 1970). Her Tales of White House Life Head for Tv, but Lillian Parks Knows How to Keep a Secret. People.com (archive). Accessed July 8, 2019.

1961 American novels
Autobiographical novels
American novels adapted into television shows